Siddhant Lohani (born 2 March 1995) is a Nepalese cricketer. Lohani is a right-handed batsman and a leg break bowler. He made his debut for Nepal against Jersey in July 2015. He represents the Region No.1 Biratnagar of the National League, Colors X-Factors of the Nepal Premier League and Merryland College, which plays in the SPA Cup.

Playing career
Siddhant first represented Nepal Under-19s in the 2014 ACC Under-19 Asia Cup.

He plays for Region no. 1 Biratnagar in the domestic league. He scored a half century off just 19 balls and went on to score 67 runs off 25 balls against Region no. 8 Pokhara in the Senior One-Day National Cricket Tournament 2015. His man of the match performance included six fours and six sixes. In the final of Kathmandu Cricket League 2015, he scored 31 runs off 15 balls as his team, Dhagahdi United, lifted the trophy.

Siddhant, known his ability to play 360 degree shots, was subsequently selected for 2015 ICC World Twenty20 Qualifier. He made his Twenty20 debut in the tournament against Jersey. Playing his debut match for Nepal, he scored 27 off 16 balls with 2 fours and 2 sixes, including a helicopter shot and caused a run out. On 19 October 2016, at a match played at the Birendranagar Cricket Club, Pathari, Siddhant scored 127 runs off just 45 balls. He hit 12 sixes and 8 fours for Seven Star Club, Itahari and won the man of the match award.

Personal life
He considers South African skipper AB de Villiers as his role model.

References

External links
 
 Siddhant Lohani on CricketArchive
 Siddhant Lohani on cricnepal.com

1995 births
Living people
People from Biratnagar
Nepalese cricketers